RAQ are a psychedelic/progressive rock jam band quartet from Burlington, Vermont.

History

The group formed in 2000 with original keyboard player Marc Scortino and released their first studio effort "Shed Tech" a year later. In 2002 Scortino left the band and was replaced by Todd Stoops. Along with Chris Michetti (Guitar), Jay Burwick (Bass) and Greg Stukey (Drums) the band would release their second album "Carbohydrates Are The Enemy" later in the year and embark on their first national tour. In 2006 Harmonized Records signed RAQ and helped release their third studio album "Ton These". In 2013 the band re-formed with Adrian Tramantano on drums.

In a 2004 article, music writer Eric Ward Glide Magazine stated, "They've invented the concept of jambands even having an old school style to bring back in the first place."

RAQ ended a 20-month hiatus with the announcement of a show on April 30, 2010 at the Bowery Ballroom in New York City. During the hiatus, Chris Michetti toured with his own band called Michetti. The band originally included Rob O'Dea on bass and Tim Sharbough on drums. Sharbough was eventually replaced by Greg Stukey. Jay Burwick opened with a solo acoustic set for Michetti on a short tour in early 2009, usually joined by Michetti for one or two songs. Michetti usually performed a mix of new songs and various covers, while Burwick performed a mix of new songs, humorous covers, and older RAQ songs.

Todd Stoops co-founded his project, Kung Fu.  The band is composed of Chris DeAngelis on bass, Tim Palmieri on guitar, Adrian Tramantano on drums, and Rob Somerville on tenor and soprano saxophone.

Touring

In its first national tour in 2002, the quartet played at North American musical festivals including Tennessee's Bonnaroo Music Festival, California's High Sierra Music Festival, Wakarusa Music and Camping Festival, Florida's Langerado Music Festival, New York's moe.down, Massachusett's Berkshire Mountain Music Festival, and Vermont's Garden of Eden Festival . The band has also appeared at venues such as the Great American Music Hall in San Francisco and the Knitting Factory in New York City. RAQ completed a tour of Colorado performing in front of sold out crowds in Telluride, Denver and Breckenridge .

Recognition

RAQ was chosen as a 'New Groove of the Month' by Jambands.com, and nominated for a 'Jammy' Award in the category of 'Best New Band'. Relix Magazine featured the band in its Spotlight section, saying "RAQ has the ability to captivate an audience, dropping jaws with hyperkinetic improvisational splendor." The band was also highlighted by Relix as one of the top bands to look out for in the summer of 2005.

Discography

Shed Tech
Released: March 1, 2001 (debut album - currently out of print)

Artists
Marc Scortino: Keyboards and vocals
Chris Michetti: Guitar and vocals
Greg Stukey: Drums
Jay Burwick: Bass and vocals

Track listing
 Time Bomb
 There When I Land
 Verde Burro
 Tunnel Vision
 Hot Wired
 Confuzor
 Weakling
 Guilty Pleasure
 Last Bag
 Welcome to the Donkey Show

Carbohydrates
Released: 2002

RAQ's second release and first to feature keyboardist, Todd Stoops. The album was produced by Grammy Award winner Mark Johnson (Paul Simon, Los Lobos, Jackson Browne) in Colchester Vermont at Egan Media Productions, and mixed by Johnson in Los Angeles.

Artists
 Todd Stoops: Keyboards/Vocals
 Chris Michetti: Guitar/Vocals
 Greg Stukey: Drums
 Jay Burwick: Bass/Vocals

Track listing
 Shirley Be a Drooler
 TheDownLow
 Beauregard
 Georgia
 Brother from Another Mother
 The Hunter Becomes the Hunted
 Circumstance
 Carbohydrates Are The Enemy
 Sweet Cream Butter
 Hannah Can
 Barometric Whether
 The Anthem of Beauregard

Ton These
Released: 2006

RAQ's third album. Recorded at Phish guitarist Trey Anastasio's recording studio The Barn, in Vermont.

Artists
 Todd Stoops: Keyboards/Vocals
 Chris Michetti: Guitar/Vocals
 Greg Stukey: Drums
 Jay Burwick: Bass/Vocals

Track listing
 Walking in Circles
 Forget Me Not
 Tumbling Down
 Glimpse
 Lush of Lush
 Bootch Magoo
 Will Run
 City Funk
 One of These Days
 Said & Done
 The Whistler
 Botz

References

External links

Jay Burwick at Reverb Nation
http://www.hyperfunkalicious.net/, a fansite
Internet Archive Live concert recordings from the Internet Archive
Ton These CD review at Home Grown Music
March 2005 feature at Glide Magazine
RAQ album Review at Jambase

American psychedelic rock music groups
American progressive rock groups
Rock music groups from Vermont
Jam bands